Alexey Fyodorovich Vishnya (September 18, 1964, Leningrad) is a musician, vocalist, poet, songwriter and sound engineer

Alexey Vishnya was born in Leningrad. His parents from the late 1950s to the early 1960s worked in Latin America, from where they brought an extensive collection of records, and later encouraged their son's passion for music by buying him equipment.

At the age of 12, Vishnya became interested in cinema, as a result of which he enrolled in courses for projectionists and photojournalists at the House of Technology and Career Guidance, while attending an acoustics and sound recording circle, whose teacher was Andrei Tropillo in the spring of 1980. He made his debut as an independent sound engineer under the supervision of Tropillo at the turn of the 80s. He assisted Tropillo and Boris Grebenshchikov on the recording of the album 45.

Discography

Solo releases 
 1984 — Last Album
 1987 — Heart
 1989 — Dancing on Broken Glass
 1991 — Illusions
 1998 — Sailor's Dream
 2000 — Alexey Vishnya feat. Irie
 2003 — Viagra for Putin  
 2003 — Politekhno 
 2004 — Million Against
 2004 — Reboot
 2014 — Cherry Kino

DK 
 1988 — Unforgivable Forgetfulness

Alexander Bashlachev 
 1985 — Third Capital

Kino 
 1983 — 46
 1985 — Eto ne lyubov...
 1986 — Love is Not a Joke (published in 2020)
 1988 — Gruppa krovi

AVIA 
 1986 — The Life and Work of the Composer Zudov

Mify 
1987 — Mythology
1988 — Madison Street
1989 — Bay, the Bell!!!

References

External links 
 
 Певец Алексей Вишня
 

1964 births
Living people
20th-century Russian male singers
20th-century Russian singers
21st-century Russian male singers
21st-century Russian singers
Musicians from Saint Petersburg
Russian audio engineers
Soviet male composers
Russian male composers